Patrick Anthony Hector (born on 29 July 1958) is an English former first-class cricketer. He played in three matches for Essex in the 1977 English cricket season. He also appeared for the England Under-19 cricket team in two One-Day International matches against Australia in England in the same cricket season.

Hector was a right-handed lower-order batsman, though in his first first-class match against Cambridge University he  batted in the Essex middle order and scored 40 runs, his career-best score. He was also a right-arm fast-medium pace bowler who opened the bowling. His best bowling performance came in his last match, with three for 56 against Leicestershire.

Wisden wrote in 1978 that Hector was "highly thought of by the senior players" at Essex, but he did not appear for the county again, although he played second eleven cricket for a further season.

Personal life
Pat was born in England and is of Jamaican descent. His son Michael is a professional footballer with Fulham and is an international footballer for the Jamaica national football team.

References

1958 births
Living people
English cricketers
Essex cricketers
English people of Jamaican descent